The Handel organ concertos, Op. 7, HWV 306–311, refer to the six organ concertos for organ and orchestra composed by George Frideric Handel in London between 1740 and 1751, published posthumously in 1761 by the printing company of John Walsh. They were written for performance during Handel's oratorios, contain almost entirely original material, including some of his most popular and inspired movements.

Works

Borrowings
HWV 306 – Originally composed material. The first movement contains a quotation from the Passacaglia in the Suite in G minor for harpsichord, HWV 432.
HWV 307 – The last movement is based on La Coquette from Suite No.6 of Componimenti musicali by Gottlieb Muffat.
HWV 308 – The second minuet is by an unidentified composer.
HWV 309 – The second movement is borrowed from Georg Philipp Telemann's Tafelmusik (1733) and the last from his own Concerto, Op. 3, No. 6.
HWV 310 – The first movement contains themes derived from the Trio sonatas, Op. 2, No. 1 and No. 8. The closing Gavotte is a more elaborate reworking of a movement from the organ concerto, Op. 4, No. 3. The final gavotte is also thematically related to the aria from Agrippina (HWV 6), "Non ho cor che per amarti...".
HWV 311 – Originally composed material.

Organo ad libitum
Although a complete version of the first set of organ concertos, Op. 4 appeared in Handel's lifetime in 1738, many of the concertos of the posthumous Op. 7 set have missing movements and sections, where Handel would have either used an existing movement solo keyboard from one of his other works or improvised directly. In the case of Op. 7, No.1, HWV 306, Handel actually indicates that parts of the Passacaglia from the Suite in G minor HWV 432 for harpsichord are to be played; the score already contains quotations for this work. It is also reported by contemporaries that Handel would often play a slow and quiet voluntary for organ solo as a prelude to his concertos.

After Handel's death, his amanuensis and personal assistant John Christopher Smith collaborated with the mechanical organ maker John Langshaw (1725–1798) in transcribing a selection of Handel's works for chamber barrel organ. Two mechanical "organ machines", operated by a hand crank, were constructed for John Stuart, 3rd Earl of Bute: the first had 58 barrels, 32 of which were devoted to works by Handel, and was built by the organ-builder John Snetzler and clockmaker Christopher Pinchbeck in 1763, a year after Stuart became Prime Minister; a second had 6 extra barrels and was built by the Bond Street watchmaker Alexander Cumming, who left a detailed inventory for each barrel, including timings in seconds for each movement. One barrel contained the concertos Op. 4, No. 5 and Op. 7, No.3 and another the concerto Op. 7, No.4 with the ad libitum slow movement provided by the sarabande and variations on La Folia from Handel's Suite in D minor for harpsichord HWV 437. Cumming's inventory is all that survives of these organs, one having been destroyed in a fire in 1843. There is an existing set of barrels, however, for the chamber barrel organ made by Henry Holland around 1790, formerly in the Colt Clavier Collection and now at Hammerwood Park in Sussex. These contain two concertos HWV 290 and 294 from Op. 4 with elaborate ornamentation supplied by Smith and have been recorded by Erato.

Two modern performing editions of the concertos by the organists and musicologists Peter Williams and Ton Koopman provide missing movements and give suggestions for the ad libitum passages, possibly too earthbound according to some commentators. The recordings of the organists George Malcolm (1976) and Richard Egarr (2009) give further possibilities, which have so far not appeared in printed editions.

Characteristics

 HWV 306 – First performed on the double manual organ in the theatre in Lincoln's Inn Fields, this is the unique concerto of the series with a pedal part, the pedalboard probably having been coupled to the lower register of one of the keyboards for the occasion. It is on a grander and more majestic scale than the earlier Op. 4 concertos, written for the more intimate single keyboard chamber organ. The first and second movements together form a single chaconne over a ground bass, over which the organ plays a series of simple but arresting variations. There is a chaconne-like bass in the following largo which gives way to the brilliant and tuneful closing bourrée.
 HWV 307 – This concerto is more lyrical and on a smaller scale than the first, with an unscored third movement.
 HWV 308 – Also on a grand scale, this concerto opens with an allegro based on a motive similar to Handel's Hallelujah Chorus. It is followed by a long spiritoso based on a hornpipe. An unscored adagio and fugue leads into the two concluding minuets.
 HWV 309 – The fourth concerto starts with a noble elegiac adagio, with passages alternating between divided cellos and bassoons and the solo organ. It is followed by an energetic and majestic allegro. An unscored slow movement leads into a lively finale in 3/8 time.
 HWV 310 – In the opening movement, vigorous unison tutti passages alternate with more complex chromatic passages for organ alone. An improvised adagio leads into a grand andante larghetto, a series of variations for the organ over an ostinato bass, marked piano until the forte of the last variation. The concerto concludes with a conventional minuet and gavotte.
 HWV 311 – This concerto, similar in form to a Vivaldi concerto, has three movements, the second unscored and the last containing three ad libitum sections.

Discography
 George Malcolm (organ), Academy of St Martin in the Fields. 1976
 Handel Organ Concertos, Op. 7, Nos. 1–6; Organ Concertos, Op. 4, Nos. 1–6. Herbert Tachezi (organ), Nikolaus Harnoncourt (conductor), Concentus Musicus Wien. Teldec – 8573 87790 2-CD set (originally released on LP, 1982)
 Peter Hurford (organ), Concertgebouw Chamber Orchestra. Decca 1987
 Handel Organ Concertos. Paul Nicholson (organ), Brandenburg Consort. Recorded on the organ of St Lawrence's Church, Whitchurch. Hyperion 1996
 Handel Organ Concertos, Op. 7, Academy of Ancient Music, Richard Egarr (organ), Harmonia Mundi, HMU807447/48, 2009. Partly recorded on the Handel House Organ in St George's, Hanover Square.

See also
Organ concertos, Op. 4 (Handel)
List of concertos by George Frideric Handel

Notes

Sources

, Chapter 7 by Basil Lam (list of self-borrowings)

Further reading

, Ph.D. dissertation

, edition by Helmut Walcha with reduction of orchestral parts for a second keyboard
, Organ part on two staves with orchestral tuttis, reconstructions of missing movements and ad libitum passages
, Score and solo part with reconstructions of missing movements and ad libitum passages. Continuo realized by Jan Kleinbussink.

, Chapter 15, "Handel and the Organ Concerto: What we know 250 years later", by William D. Gudger

External links
Reconstruction of Handel's chamber organ, now housed in St George's, Hanover Square, Handel's parish church

, Richard Egarr, English Reformed Church, Amsterdam (including the voluntary used as a prelude to HWV 307)
Audio recordings with Richard Egarr and the Academy of Ancient Music on the chamber organ of St George's, Hanover Square: HWV 306/3, HWV309/1
Audio recordings with Marie-Claire Alain and the Freiburger Barockorchester, conducted by Gottfried von der Goltz: HWV 306/1–2, HWV 306/3–4

Organ concertos by George Frideric Handel
1751 compositions